Zechariah of Lyon was the third bishop of Lyon. He is recognized as a saint by both the Roman Catholic Church and the Eastern Orthodox Church. His feast day is celebrated on June 28.

Very little is known of his life. He escaped in the persecution of 202 and succeeded St. Irenaeus as bishop of Lyon.  Like most of the early bishops of Lyon, his name is of Greek origin.

References

Year of death missing
Bishops of Lyon
3rd-century bishops in Gaul
Gallo-Roman saints
Year of birth unknown